Chick culling or unwanted chick killing is the process of separating and killing unwanted (male and unhealthy female) chicks for which the intensive animal farming industry has no use. It occurs in all industrialised egg production, whether free range, organic, or battery cage. However, some certified pasture-raised egg farms are taking steps to eliminate the practice entirely. Worldwide, around 7 billion male chicks are culled each year in the egg industry. Because male chickens do not lay eggs and only those in breeding programmes are required to fertilise eggs, they are considered redundant to the egg-laying industry and are usually killed shortly after being sexed, which occurs just days after they are conceived or after they hatch. Some methods of culling that do not involve anaesthetics include: cervical dislocation, asphyxiation by carbon dioxide, and maceration using a high-speed grinder. Maceration is the primary method in the United States. Maceration is often a preferred method over carbon dioxide asphyxiation in western countries as it is often considered as "more humane" due to the deaths occurring immediately or within a second.

Due to modern selective breeding, laying hen strains differ from meat production strains (broilers). In the United States, males are culled in egg production because males "don't lay eggs or grow large enough to become broilers."

Ducklings and goslings are also culled in the production of foie gras. However, because males gain more weight than females in this production system, the females are culled, sometimes in an industrial macerator. Up to 40 million female ducks per year may be killed in this way. The remains of female ducklings are later used in cat food and fertilisers.

Because of animal welfare concerns, there is societal opposition to chick culling. In the 2010s, scientists developed technologies to determine the sexes of chicks when they are still in their eggs (in-ovo sexing). As soon as these methods were available on a commercial scale, Germany and France jointly became the first countries in the world to prohibit all chick killing from 1 January 2022, and called on other EU member states to do the same.

History

Prior to the development of modern broiler meat breeds, most male chickens (cockerels) were slaughtered for meat, whereas females (pullets) would be kept for egg production. However, once the industry successfully bred separate meat and egg-producing hybrids—starting in the 1920s and 1930s—there was no reason to keep males of the egg-producing hybrid. As a consequence, the males of egg-laying chickens are killed as soon as possible after hatching and sexing to reduce financial losses incurred by the breeder. Special techniques have been developed to accurately determine the sex of chicks at as young an age as possible.

In November 2018, the "world's first industry-scale production no-kill eggs" were sold to the public in Berlin, Germany.

Methods

Several methods are used to cull chicks:
 Maceration (also called 'grinding', 'shredding' or 'mincing'); the chicks are placed into a large high-speed grinder.
 Asphyxiation (also called 'gassing' or 'controlled atmosphere killing'); carbon dioxide is used to induce unconsciousness and then death.
 Cervical dislocation; the neck is broken.
 Electrocution; an electric current is passed through the chick's body until it is dead.
 Suffocation; the chicks are placed in plastic bags.

Permitted methods in the EU 
Authorised procedures for killing chicks have been harmonised within the European Union. The regulations initiated in 1976 evolved in 1993, the first directive to specifically take chicks into account. A new directive was adopted in 2009, enacted on 1 January 2013 (replacing the 1993 directive) and last updated on 14 December 2019:
 "Use of a mechanical apparatus causing rapid death" (essentially grinding)
 "Exposure to carbon dioxide" (essentially gassing)

Recommended methods in the US 
The American Veterinary Medical Association (AMVA) "Euthanasia" methods include: cervical dislocation, maceration, and asphyxiation by carbon dioxide. The 2005–2006 AMVA Executive Board proposed a policy change, recommended by the Animal Welfare Committee on the killing of unwanted chicks, poults, and pipped eggs. The policy states:
 'Unwanted chicks, poults, and pipped eggs should be killed by an acceptable humane method, such as use of a commercially designed macerator that results in instantaneous death. Smothering unwanted chicks or poults in bags or containers is not acceptable. Pips, unwanted chicks, or poults should be killed prior to disposal. A pipped egg, or pip, is one where the chick or poult has not been successful in escaping the egg shell during the hatching process.'

US producers announced in 2016 a goal of being able by 2020 to determine the sex of the developing chick long before hatching, so male eggs can be destroyed. However in January 2020 they stated that killing day-old male chicks remains unavoidable due to the lack of a viable alternative.

Statistics 

 Worldwide: approximately 7 billion male chicks are culled annually around the world (2015 Poultry Site estimate). Other estimates include 6 billion (June 2016 SMH claim), 4–6 billion chicks (December 2018 The Guardian claim). According to In Ovo cofounder Wouter Bruins in October 2013, the top 20 poultry production countries alone culled 3.2 billion male chicks a year.
 Australia: more than 12 million male chicks are culled annually (June 2016 estimate). Maceration is the primary method used, but gassing is also used.
 Belgium: more than 15 million male chicks are culled annually, 40,000 a day (February 2020 estimate). CO2 gassing is the only method used and happens in two stages: chicks are first stunned and then killed.
 Canada: 22.5 million male chicks are culled annually, nearly 62,000 a day (December 2016 estimate). 
 France: 50 million male chicks are culled annually in the egg industry (February 2020 estimate) and about 16 million female ducklings and goslings are culled annually in the foie gras industry. Maceration is the primary method in both industries.
 Germany: up to 50 million male chicks are culled annually (October 2019 estimate). Gassing is the primary method.
 India: over 180 million male chicks are culled annually (October 2014 estimate). Maceration appears to be the primary method, though suffocation using plastic bags has also been reported.
 Netherlands: 45 million male chicks are culled annually (May 2016 estimate). Gassing is the primary method.
 New Zealand: 2.5 million (April 2001 estimate) to 3 million (June 2016 estimate) male chicks are culled annually. Maceration is the primary method.
 Spain: 35 million male chicks are culled annually (March 2020 estimate).
 Switzerland: about 3 million male chicks are culled annually (September 2019 estimate). Gassing is the only method used; maceration was prohibited on 1 January 2020, but rarely used before that date.
 United Kingdom: 30 to 40 million male chicks are culled annually (November 2010 Viva! claim). A November 2010 Telegraph article reported on two undercover operations carried out by animal rights organisation Viva! showing a gassing-method hatchery and a maceration-method hatchery, both located in Preston. Both methods were reportedly 'legal and approved by both the Humane Slaughter Association and the RSPCA', with a British Egg Information Service (BEIS) spokesman saying gassing was used more often than maceration in the UK. In March 2015, a BEIS spokesman insisted that gassing was the only method used in the UK.
 United States: 300 million male chicks are culled annually (January 2020 The Humane Society claim). The Associated Press estimated this number at 200 million in 2009. Maceration is the primary method.

Controversy and phaseout 
Animal welfare advocates maintain that many of the current practices surrounding chicken slaughtering are unethical. Animal rights advocates argue that it is wrong to unnecessarily exploit and kill other sentient beings for food production, including chicks.

Scientific research into alternatives (2010s) 
 

Several technologies may obviate chick culling by determining the sex of a chick before hatching. These technologies rely on measuring eggs (through spectroscopy, chemical assays, or imaging); they can determine a chick's sex within 4–9 days of laying. Some methods require genetic engineering to make male eggs fluorescent. Such methods are attractive not only for ethical reasons but to reduce the costs of employing human cullers and of incubating male eggs. Timothy Kurt, a director from the United States Department of Agriculture, said, "Everyone wants the same thing, and the right piece of technology could solve this right now."

A Unilever spokesperson has been quoted as saying in 2014: "We have also committed to providing funding and expertise for research and introduction of alternative methods such as in-ovo gender identification (sexing) of eggs. This new technology offers the potential to eliminate the hatching and culling of male chicks."

In 2015, the Leipzig University developed a method to determine the gender of fertilized eggs 72 hours after the incubation process has started. The procedure would use a laser to drill a hole into the eggshell and analyze the way the egg's blood cells disperse that light using near-infrared Raman spectroscopy. The hole in the eggshell would then be sealed again, and female embryos could be incubated as normal. Males would still be discarded, but earlier in their development.

In 2018, Agriculture and Agri-Food Canada, invested $844,000 to electronically "scan" fertilized eggs to determine if they are male or female.
  
In September 2019, the Foundation for Food and Agriculture Research, a company that was founded by the United States Congress in 2014 will award six contestants from ten countries, $6 million for working entries. United Egg Producers intends to be cull-free by 2020.

CRISPR technology uses a "pair of molecular scissors" to illuminate the male chicks after being conceived and before being placed in the incubator to be hatched, thus eliminating all male chicks from being hatched.

In spring 2021, the Leiden-based Dutch company In Ovo presented the new in ovo-sexing machine "Ella", which had an accuracy of over 95%, which could possibly be upgraded to 99% in the short term. Its method of retrieving some fluid from the fertilised egg with a needle, and finding the biomarker sabineamine in this sample with mass spectrometry, takes less than one second to perform.

In late May 2021, a research team from the Technische Hochschule OWL based in Lemgo, Germany, claimed to be able to shine a laser into a small hole in fertilised eggs’ scale, and derive its sex from the reflected light using fluorescence spectroscopy within six days, thus complying to Germany's legal requirement of early sexing from 2024. Startups including Respeggt and In Ovo responded skeptically, saying the publication of these conclusions seemed rushed, and that "many methods may seem promising at first, but aren't immediately useful in practice."

Legal challenge in Germany (2013–2019) 
In 2013, the German state of North Rhine-Westphalia issued a decree banning hatcheries from killing chicks, against which two egg hatcheries in the state appealed. As paragraph one of Germany's Animal Welfare Act stipulates that "No-one shall inflict pain, suffering or harm on an animal without a reasonable cause," a lower court ruled that killing for food production was a "reasonable" ground. This led to a challenge in the Federal Administrative Court in Leipzig. On 13 June 2019, this court decided that the current way of culling chicks "violates the country's laws against killing animals without a justifiable reason." However, the court allowed hatcheries to keep culling chicks on a temporary basis until alternatives, such as sex determination in eggs, are introduced. Such "no-kill eggs" had been introduced into the German market in 2018 and were available in more than 200 shops by June 2019, but there was no industrial-scale solution available yet.

Political efforts (2019–present) 

In response to the June 2019 Leipzig court ruling, German Agriculture Minister Julia Klöckner stated chick culling was "ethically unacceptable" and argued it should be prohibited. The Grand Coalition agreement of March 2018 stated that chick culling should have been ended "by the middle of the current legislative period", which would have been in October 2019, but this goal was not met. At that time, gassing was the most common method of chick culling in Germany, which killed up to 50 million chicks a year. Although the federal government had already invested millions of euros in stimulating scientific research into two alternative methods for sex determination in eggs by then, these were still not ready for the market yet.

In September 2019, in Switzerland, the parliament voted to outlaw the shredding of chickens. This is despite this practice not being used in Switzerland. It was further commented that: "This tendency to rear species only for the production of eggs or for meat turns animals into mere objects. It has led to absurd practices such as the shredding of living male chicks". However, the practice of gassing chicks, which kills about three million male baby chicks in Switzerland per year, remained legal.

In late October 2019, French Agriculture Minister Didier Guillaume told France Inter: "We announced last week with my colleague, German Minister for Agriculture [Julia Klöckner], that we were going to stop the shredding of chicks, which is no longer bearable today. We said end of the year 2021." He further argued that the practice needed to be phased out and not immediately discontinued: "If we do it right away, what will happen? There won't be eggs anymore."

On 13 January 2020, during an official visit of Guillaume to Klöckner, the Ministers said in a joint statement that France and Germany wanted to end the mass shredding of male chicks at the EU level by the end of 2021. Guillaume stated that "France and Germany should be the European motor to advance on this issue", with Klöckner adding that Germany's EU presidency in the second half of 2020 was a good opportunity to do so. The countries planned to bring together various groups to share scientific knowledge and implement alternative methods. On 28 January 2020, Guillaume repeated at a press conference that the culling of unwanted male chicks (by shredding) would be outlawed in France by the end of 2021. While some animal rights activists welcomed the move, others said that the decision did not go far enough. The minister's entourage told Agence France-Presse that it was unclear whether his announced ban also included asphyxiation by CO2 (which was excluded from the Swiss ban), pressing him to explicitly prohibit that chick culling method as well.

In early February 2020, four Dutch animal rights organisations sent letters to Prime Minister Mark Rutte and the Parliamentary Commission on Agriculture urging them to follow the examples given by Switzerland and France, and phase out all chick culling including gassing in the Netherlands by the end of 2021. The Dutch Ministry of Agriculture cautiously responded that "a political solution is being explored" and that the Agriculture Minister would soon provide more information. In March 2020, the Directorate of Production and Agrarian Markets of the Spanish Ministry of Agriculture stated that it is working with egg producers to end the annual culling of 35 million male chicks in Spain in 2021. The Ministry said producers were testing two different techniques of in-ovo sex detection.

In January 2021, the German federal government approved a draft law banning chick culling, to be effectuated at the end of 2021. If passed by the Bundestag, Germany would become the first country in the world to ban this practice, confirming its joint commitment with France made in January 2020. On 20 May 2021, the Bundestag indeed voted to ban the culling of male chicks in Germany from 1 January 2022. Although as of 2021 the scientific consensus was that chicken embryos wouldn't be able to experience pain until day 11 at the earliest, and at the time most in ovo-sexing startups managed to sex them at day 9, the new German law also dictated that by 1 January 2024, all fertilised eggs in Germany must be sexed within 6 days to avoid any chance of the embryo having consciousness and thus being able to experience pain, presenting new challenges to scientists.

On 15 June 2021, the Dutch parliament by 81 votes to 69 adopted a motion directed at Agriculture Minister Carola Schouten to ban chick killing in the Netherlands. The motion, written and submitted by MPs Sandra Beckerman (SP) and Leonie Vestering (PvdD), stated: "[Parliament], noting that about 40 million male chicks are killed in the Netherlands annually because they have no economic value; considering that this is unnecessary because there are alternatives; considering that France and Germany are already introducing a ban; pronounces that the killing of male chicks should be prohibited." The same day, another motion by MPs Beckerman and Derk Boswijk (CDA), adopted by a much larger majority of 115 votes to 35, requested the government to inquire how, and how fast, a ban on killing male chicks could be introduced. The motion reiterated that the annual killing of 40 million Dutch male chicks was unnecessary, that France and Germany were already introducing a ban, and furthermore stated that "a ban in the Netherlands is desirable and must be done in a way that is good for animals, farmers and consumers."

On 18 July 2021, French Minister of Agriculture, Julien Denormandie, announced chick culling would be banned from 1 January 2022. Both maceration and gassing will be prohibited, and the French government would grant chicken breeders subsidies of 10 million euros combined in order to acquire in-ovo sexing machines instead (leading to extra consumer costs of about 1 eurocent per box of six eggs). Denormandie stated that two-thirds of the poultry industry was expected to have adopted these machines by the end of the first quarter of 2022. and must have them installed by December 31, 2022. On 21 July 2021, Germany and France made a joint declaration that called on other EU member states to prohibit chick culling throughout the Union; their call was officially supported by Austria, Spain, Ireland, Luxembourg, and Portugal.

Recently, the government of the Indian state of Kerala has also started taking steps to curb this inhumane practice on the behest of PETA India. India too has prevalence of the practice of male chick culling in its egg industry like its American counterpart.

Business efforts (2018–present) 
Currently, the following businesses (producers, distributors and retailers) are in the process of introducing no-kill eggs (also called 'brotherless eggs') and phasing out kill eggs:

 German supermarket chain REWE is one of the main stakeholders of the Dutch–German Seleggt company that developed the first no-kill eggs. Under the label of Respeggt, these no-kill eggs were first introduced in 350 supermarkets and shops of REWE and Penny in the Berlin region in November 2018. By September 2019, Respeggt eggs were sold in 1,350 REWE shops.
 German supermarket chains Edeka, Marktkauf and Famila introduced brotherless eggs in 2019.
 French retail multinational Carrefour, Fermiers de Loué and German group Agri Advanced Technologies (AAT) introduced no-kill eggs in France in December 2019. On 10 February 2020, Carrefour announced it planned to mark the package of no-kill eggs with special logos, to have 20% of all its eggs sold without chick culling by 1 May 2020, and to completely produce and sell all eggs with the AAT method before the end of 2021. The number of Carrefour locations that sold AAT-style eggs grew gradually in the first half of 2020.  
 In early February 2020, French egg distribution business Cocorette announced it would collaborate with poultry company Novoponto to produce no-kill eggs using Seleggt's technology.
 The German supermarket chains Aldi Nord and Aldi Süd announced in March 2020 they wanted to phase out chick culling in their entire chain before 2022. Aldi Netherlands was still considering its course as of May 2020.
 Dutch supermarket chain Jumbo was the first company in the Netherlands to start selling Respeggt eggs. Since mid-March 2020, all Jumbo supermarkets (more than 600 locations in the Netherlands and a few in Belgium) had them in store, and organic Respeggt eggs are planned to be introduced later in 2020.
 Dutch supermarket chain Coop (over 300 locations) will start selling free-range Respeggt eggs in September 2020.
 In July 2021, the Dutch in-ovo sexing machine companies Respeggt and In Ovo stated that in-ovo sexing was gaining momentum in Northwestern Europe, and major retailers were switching to it in anticipation of the German legal ban on chick killing. Generally speaking, the extra costs were not transferred to producers, but to consumers (at about 1 eurocent per egg in the case of Respeggt). Respeggt CEO Martijn Haarman stated: "The [poultry] industry is demonstrating that it has listened to society's desire to no longer kill male chicks. ... So now it's up to the consumer to decide if that higher price [of 1 cent per egg] is worth paying in order to prevent chick killing." Haarman also argued that the alternative of raising male chicks to roosters for meat was not economically viable, and "a step back both for animal welfare and the environment."

The following businesses are considering or have committed to introducing no-kill eggs and phasing out kill eggs:
 In 2016, United Egg Producers, representing hatcheries that produce 95% of all eggs in the United States, reached an agreement with The Humane League that it would voluntarily phase out chick culling by 2020, or as soon as it was 'economically feasible' and an alternative was "commercially available". In January 2020, UEP president Chad Gregory said "a workable, scalable, solution is not yet available", but remained "a priority and the right thing to do" and that the UEP are "hopeful a breakthrough is on the horizon". The Humane League president David Coman-Hidy was similarly optimistic about the technological progress made and remains confident that alternatives will be soon be put in place "in order to spare the lives of the estimated 300 million male chicks that are killed every year in the U.S. alone". As of March 25, 2021, according to a press release from United Egg Producers, the agreement had not been upheld.
 Albert Heijn, the largest Dutch supermarket chain, with 1000 locations in the Netherlands and Belgium, stated in May 2020 that they are "meticulously monitoring the technological developments, and when it's operationally feasible, we will enable it".

See also
Animal–industrial complex
Culling
Chick sexing
Gendercide

References

External links

Hatchery Horrors: The Egg Industry's tiniest victims. Mercy for Animals. (includes graphic video on culling)
Germany Ponders the Super Chicken. Der Spiegel. October 16, 2013.
The short, brutal life of male chickens. Al Jazeera America. February 20, 2015.
Animal Equality investigation in chicken hatcheries. Animal Equality via YouTube. November 25, 2015.
Stop killing male chicks: We can save billions of animal lives from meeting a gruesome end. Gene Baur for the New York Daily News. February 8, 2020.

Animal culling
Cruelty to animals
Egg farming
Ethically disputed business practices towards animals
Intensive farming
Poultry farming